Notemakers are a type of software tool first produced for the Commodore 64. They are designed to allow an author to write a multiple-page note that is saved as a compact self-executing program. When the program is executed, the note displays itself, usually with music and other visual effects, allowing pagination.

Tour de Future achieved fame by developing the first "viral" notemaker: the note reader incorporated a writer, so that new notes could be written, saved and distributed, and so on. Typically, these notes would be release notes accompanying new software, or personal or public messages to other friends within the scene. 

The group, and its successor Tera, produced several further notemakers, as a strategy to increase its visibility across the scene. The concept caught on, and many notemakers were soon developed.

Notemakers were later popular on the Apple Macintosh series of computers as DocViewer and its competing products.

References

External links 
 tour de future 'notemaker v1.0' at CSDb

Demoscene
Commodore 64 software